Super Bad is the second solo album by DJ Terminator X.  The album was released on June 21, 1994, on Def Jam Recordings sub-label RAL and was produced by Terminator X, Kool DJ Herc, Grandmaster Flash, and Russell Simmons.  The album was only a minor success, making it to #189 on the Billboard 200 and #38 on the Top R&B/Hip-Hop Albums. Two singles were released, "Under the Sun" and "It All Comes Down to the Money," the latter of which made it to #26 on the Hot Rap Singles. "It All Comes Down to the Money" was released in 1993.

Production
Super Bad features guest appearances from many hip hop musicians, including Ice Cube, Chuck D, Ice-T, Whodini, Grandmaster Flash, Kool DJ Herc, Cold Crush Brothers, The Fantastic Five, and Jam Master Jay.

Critical reception
Vibe wrote that "although much of Super Bad is fueled by spare beats--slinky keyboards here, the signature PE siren loops there, scratching and drum machine effects everywhere--Terminator X makes good on his tip-off proclamation 'I speak with my hands.'" Billboard praised "Under the Sun," calling it "an intelligent vibe, fueled by some of the spaciest grooves since Parliament." Trouser Press wrote: "Tripping from Jamaica to the Bronx and back, the diverse album is kinetic, jazzy, soulful, cinematic and absurdly entertaining."

Track listing
"Terminator's Back" feat. Kool DJ Herc – 1:47
"Kidds From the Terror" feat. Punk Barbarians – 2:55
"Godfather Promo" – 0:09
"Sticka" feat. Chuck D, Ice Cube, Ice-T, MC Lyte & Punk Barbarians – 3:58
"Money Promo" – 0:26
"It All Comes Down to the Money" feat. Whodini – 5:28
"Thumpin's Goin On  Rogers" feat. Kool DJ Herc – 1:25
"Krunch Time" – 3:06
"G'Damn Datt DJ Made My Day" feat. Grandmaster Flash – 2:14
"Stylewild '94" feat. Cold Crush Brothers & The Fantastic Five – 5:59
"Funky Piano" – 0:54
"A Side Final Promo" – 0:24
"Make Room for Thunder" feat. Kool DJ Herc – 2:29
"Scary-Us" feat. Flatlinerz – 3:41
"Learn That Poem" – 0:41
"Under the Sun" feat. Joe Sinistr – 3:45
"1994 Street Muthafukkas Gong Show"  3:52
"Don't Even Go There" feat. Bonnie 'N' Clyde – 3:53
"Herc Yardman Word" – 0:54
"Mashitup" feat. Prince Collin – 3:42
"Say My Brother" – 0:07
"Put Cha Thang Down" – 5:16
"Herc's Message" feat. Kool DJ Herc – 1:25

Charts

Singles
It All Comes Down to the Money

Under the Sun

References

Terminator X albums
1994 albums
Def Jam Recordings albums